Firebase Berchtesgaden (also known as Firebase Eagle's Nest or Hill 1030) was a U.S. Army firebase located west of Huế overlooking the A Shau Valley in central Vietnam.

History
The base was named after the German town of Berchtesgaden, where the Nazi leadership had their alpine retreats and which was captured by the 101st Airborne in May 1945.

The firebase was assaulted by the 6th Regiment, People's Army of Vietnam (PAVN) on the night of 14 June 1969, the assault was repulsed for the reported loss of 12 U.S. killed and 33 PAVN soldiers killed and three captured.

Units based at the firebase included:
2nd Battalion, 11th Artillery
2nd Battalion, 319th Artillery
2nd Battalion, 327th Infantry

See also
Firebase Airborne

References

Installations of the United States Army in South Vietnam
Military installations closed in the 1970s